The Virginia Slims of Washington, now defunct, was a Grand Prix and WTA Tour affiliated tennis tournament played from 1972 to 1991. It was held in Washington, D.C. in the United States and played on indoor carpet courts from 1972 to 1975 and again from 1978 to 1990. From 1976 to 1977, it was played on indoor hard courts and in the final year it was played on outdoor hard courts.

The event was known by several different names. For most of its run, the tournament was called the Virginia Slims of Washington due to sponsorship by Virginia Slims. It was also known as the Colgate Championships of Washington and the Avon Championships of Washington.

Martina Navratilova was the most successful player, winning nine titles overall.

The tournament was abolished after the 1991 edition when its owners, Pro-Serv, sold it abroad.

Finals

Singles

Doubles

See also
 Washington Open

Notes

References

External links
 WTA Results Archive

 
Carpet court tennis tournaments
Hard court tennis tournaments
Defunct tennis tournaments in the United States
Virginia Slims tennis tournaments